The Chopping Block is an Australian reality television series which began airing on the Nine Network on 6 February 2008. Produced by Granada Productions, it was hosted by chef Matt Moran. Catriona Rowntree co-hosted the show with Moran in its first season. It ran for two series of 8 episodes each.

Format
Each week two Melbourne and Sydney restaurants were reviewed by a secret critic (ABC Radio National broadcaster and food critic Alan Saunders) and given A$5,000. With assistance from restaurateur Matt Moran, they were given 72 hours to use that money to overhaul their menu, service and décor in an effort to win both his and the critics' approval.

Episodes

Season 1

Season 2

Ratings
The first episode of The Chopping Block had a disappointing debut, with only 718,000 viewers nationally, a low figure for its 7:30–8:30 timeslot. An uncut repeat of the first episode was aired the following night at 10:30pm, managing a reasonable 546,000 viewers for its timeslot. The second episode fared much better, managing 1,040,000 viewers nationally - nearly 300,000 more viewers than the first episode.

Overall, ratings for the second series were generally higher than the first, and both series averaged 959,517 viewers across the year.

U.S. version

NBC and Granada America have picked up the rights to produce the series in the United States. The U.S. version is hosted by Marco Pierre White, and features a number of changes to the format, such as multiple contestants, an ongoing objective instead of self-contained episodes, and an emphasis on competition.

The first episode premiered on 11 March 2009, but was canceled due to low ratings after three episodes. After a 3-month hiatus, 'Chopping Block' returned to complete its season.

References

External links
 Official Website
 List of competing restaurants
 

Nine Network original programming
2000s Australian reality television series
2008 Australian television series debuts
2008 Australian television series endings
Food reality television series
Television series by ITV Studios